Sanming North railway station is a railway station located in Shaxian District, Sanming, Fujian, China. The station handles both passengers and freight.

History
The station opened on 26 September 2013 with the Xiangtang–Putian railway. At this time, services to the original Shaxian railway station on the Yingtan–Xiamen railway were suspended. In November 2014, work began to reroute the railway to pass through Sanming North and avoid the centre of Shaxian. This was completed in December 2017. The Nanping–Longyan railway was opened on 29 December 2018 and passes through this station. It also introduced a second railway station in Sanming, Sanming railway station in Sanyuan District.

References

Railway stations in Fujian
Railway stations in China opened in 2013